Keak may be,

Keak language
Keak da Sneak